Ty Keegan Simpkins (born August 6, 2001) is an American actor. His notable film credits include the supernatural horror Insidious (2011), its sequel Insidious: Chapter 2 (2013) and Jurassic World (2015). He is also known for his appearances in the Marvel Cinematic Universe as Harley Keener in Iron Man 3 (2013) and Avengers: Endgame (2019), as well as the independent film The Whale (2022).

Early life and education 
Simpkins was born in New York City, to Monique and Stephen Simpkins. His elder sibling is actor Ryan Simpkins. In 2020, he began attending San Diego State University and is a member of the Pi Kappa Alpha fraternity.

Acting career 
Simpkins first appeared on TV when he was three weeks old. His first role was on One Life to Live where he shared the recurring role as John "Jack" Cramer. Simpkins then had a recurring role as Jude Cooper Bauer on Guiding Light, in which he went on to be "Jude" for about four years. He guest starred in Law & Order: Criminal Intent and a handful of commercials and print ads.

Simpkins made his film debut in Steven Spielberg's War of the Worlds (2005). Next was a featured role in All the King's Men (2006) where he played a young version of Jude Law's character, and he played Aaron in the multiple-award-winning Little Children (2006). Simpkins went on to film Pride and Glory (2008), in which he and his sibling, actor Ryan Simpkins, play the children of Colin Farrell. Simpkins also completed Gardens of the Night (2008) and then Revolutionary Road (2008), in which he again starred alongside his real-life sibling Ryan. Simpkins has guest-starred on CSI, Private Practice and Family of Four. In September 2009, he signed on to play Luke in the 2010 film The Next Three Days. He also played Dalton Lambert in Insidious (2011) and Insidious: Chapter 2 (2013).

In 2013, Simpkins starred alongside Robert Downey Jr. in the live-action film Iron Man 3, as Tony Stark's sidekick Harley Keener (he also reprises the role in Lego Marvel's Avengers). This was the first time a child character had been featured prominently in the Iron Man films. He appeared in Iron Man 3 director Shane Black's 2016 film, The Nice Guys.

In 2019, he reprised the role of Harley Keener in a cameo during Stark's funeral at the end of the film Avengers: Endgame. Simpkins later revealed that he had to keep Stark's death, and his own cameo, a secret for two years.

Simpkins starred in the 2015 blockbuster Jurassic World, and he appeared as Adam in Meadowland.

Simpkins played a Christian missionary called Thomas in Darren Aronofsky's Oscar-winning The Whale (2022).

Filmography

Film

Television

Video games

Theater

Awards and nominations

References

External links 
 
 
 
 Ty Simpkins at Facebook

21st-century American male actors
American male child actors
American male film actors
American male television actors
Male actors from New York City
2001 births
Living people
San Diego State University alumni